Aleksa Striković (born 12 May 1961) is a Serbian chess grandmaster.

He won the FR Yugoslavia Chess Championship in 1992, and the South African Open in 2016.

He also competed in the 1998 Chess Olympiad for Yugoslavia, finishing on 3.5/7.

References

1961 births
Living people
Serbian chess players
Chess grandmasters
Chess Olympiad competitors